The University of ancient Takshashila was an ancient university located in the city of Takṣaśilā (Taxila in modern-day Pakistan) near the bank of the Indus River. According to the Ramayana, the city was founded by Bharata, the son of Kaikeyi, and younger half brother of Lord Rama.  Taxila was one of the leading seats of higher learning in ancient India. It became the capital of the Achaemenid territories in northwestern Indian subcontinent following the Achaemenid conquest of the Indus Valley around 540 BCE. Taxila was at the crossroad of the main trade roads of Asia, and was probably populated by Persians, Greeks, Scythians and many ethnicities coming from the various parts of the Achaemenid Empire.

History
The earliest remains of the site goes back to 10th century BC. Many Hindu and Buddhist scholars have studied in Taxila.

University
By some accounts, the university of ancient Taxila is considered to be one of the earliest universities in the world. Others do not consider it a university in the modern sense, in that the teachers living there may not have had official membership of particular colleges,  in contrast to the later Nalanda university in Bihar. The highly systemized Vedic model of learning helped establish large institutions such as Nalanda, Taxila and Vikramashila. These universities not only taught Vedic texts and the ritual but also the different theoretical disciplines associated with the limbs or the sciences of the Vedas, which included disciplines such as linguistics, law, astronomy and reasoning.

The university was particularly renowned for science, especially medicine, and the arts, but both religious and secular subjects were taught, and even subject such as archery or astrology. Many Jataka of early Buddhist literature mention students attending the university. Taxila university was instrumental in encouraging nationalistic values in the Indian sub-continent region against the incessant attacks from western nomads and kingdoms. Chanakya is considered to be at the fore front for promoting awareness of the natives in the Ambi, Kandhar and western provinces of India against the Barbaric ruling of Alexander's successors, who utilized native prisoners of war for their expansion missions and using them as sacrificial troops during warfare.

The role of Taxila university as a center of knowledge continued under the Maurya Empire and Greek rule (Indo-Greeks) in the 3rd and 2nd centuries BCE.

The destruction of Toramana in the 5th century CE seem to have put an end to the activities of the university.

Professors
Important professors that are said to have taught at university of Taxila include;
Pāṇini, the great 5th century BCE Indian grammarian, is said to have been born in Shalatula near Attock, not far from Taxila. This region was then part of the Gandhara satrapy of the Achaemenid Empire, but the ethnicity in his name or the way of his life shows that he was of Indian origin. He is likely to have been teaching at Taxila university.
Chanakya, the influential Prime Minister of the founder of the Mauryan Empire, Chandragupta Maurya, is also said to have been teaching at Taxila.
 Kumāralāta, according to the 3rd century Chinese Buddhist monk and traveller Yuan Chwang, Kumāralāta, the founder of Sautrāntika school was also an excellent teacher at Taxila university and attracted students from as far as China.

Students

According to Stephen Batchelor, the Buddha may have been influenced by the experiences and knowledge acquired by some of his closest followers in the foreign capital of Taxila. Several contemporaries, and close followers, of the Buddha are said to have studied in Taxila, namely:
 King Pasenadi of Kosala, a close friend of the Buddha,
 Bandhula, the commander of Pasedani's army
 Aṅgulimāla, a close follower of the Buddha. A Buddhist story about Aṅgulimāla (also called Ahiṃsaka, and later a close follower of Buddha), relates how his parents sent him to Taxila to study under a well-known teacher. There he excels in his studies and becomes the teacher's favorite student, enjoying special privileges in his teacher's house. However, the other students grow jealous of Ahiṃsaka's speedy progress and seek to turn his master against him. To that end, they make it seem as though Ahiṃsaka has seduced the master's wife.
 Jivaka, court doctor at Rajagriha and personal doctor of the Buddha. 
Charaka, the Indian "father of medicine" and one of the leading authorities in Ayurveda, is also said to have studied at Taxila, and practiced there.
Chandragupta Maurya, Buddhist literature states that Chandragupta Maurya, the future founder of the Mauryan Empire, though born near Patna (Bihar) in Magadha, was taken by Chanakya for his training and education to Taxila, and had him educated there in "all the sciences and arts" of the period, including military sciences. There he studied for eight years. The Greek and Hindu texts also state that Kautilya (Chanakya) was a native of the northwest Indian subcontinent, and Chandragupta was his resident student for eight years. These accounts match Plutarch's assertion that Alexander the Great met with the young Chandragupta while campaigning in the Punjab.

See also
Sharada Peeth
Nalanda University
Vikramashila University
Ancient institutions of learning in the Indian subcontinent

References

Sources
 
 
 

Ancient universities of the Indian subcontinent